Trematomus is a genus of marine ray-finned fishes, belonging to the family Nototheniidae, the notothens or cod icefishes. These fishes occur in the Southern Ocean.

Taxonomy
Trematomus was first described as a genus in 1902 by the Belgian-born British ichthyologist George Albert Boulenger when he described four new species of notothen from specimens collected on the Southern Cross Expedition. In 1938 John Roxborough Norman designated T. newnesi as the type species, this being the species described first in Boulenger’s text. In 1982 Arkady Vladimirovich Balushkin created the new genus Pseudotrematomus, in which he placed all the species in Trematomus other than T. newnesi, but this classification has not been widely accepted. Some authorities place this genus in the subfamily Trematominae, but the 5th edition of Fishes of the World does not include subfamilies in the Nototheniidae. The generic name Trematomus is made up of trema which means “hole” or “opening” and “tomus” which means “cut”, Boulenger explained that the “scapular fenestra being pierced in the scapula instead of between the latter and the coracoid”.

Species 
Trematomus contains these currently recognized species:
 Trematomus bernacchii Boulenger, 1902 (emerald rockcod)
 Trematomus eulepidotus Regan, 1914 (blunt scalyhead)
 Trematomus hansoni Boulenger, 1902 (striped rockcod)
 Trematomus lepidorhinus (1911) (slender scalyhead)
 Trematomus loennbergii Regan, 1913 (scaly rockcod)
 Trematomus newnesi Boulenger, 1902 (dusky rockcod)
 Trematomus nicolai (Boulenger, 1902) (spotted notothen)
 Trematomus pennellii Regan, 1914 (sharp-spined notothenia)
 Trematomus scotti (Boulenger, 1907) (crowned rockcod)
 Trematomus tokarevi Andriashev, 1978 (bigeye notothen)
 Trematomus vicarius Lönnberg, 1905 (orange notothen)

Characteristics
Trematomus rockcods have oblong bodies with wide but not depressed heads. They are large mouthed with the maxilla extending towards the middle of the eye, with conical teeth arranged in one or two rows or bands , although there are sometimes a few larger teeth to the front and along the sides of the jaws. The scales are mainly ctenoid, although there are non-ctenoid scales typically in the underside and on the back near the head. The upper lateral line has tubed scales which may be reduced in extent and in the middle lateral line the tubed scales are frequently often replaced by pored scales. The caudal fin contains10-14 branched fin rays.

Distribution, habitat and biology
Trematomus rockcods are found all around the continent of Antarctica with two species which reach as far north as South Georgia. They are benthic or epibenthic species which feed on invertebrates and smaller fishes and they are the dominant fish species on the Antarctic continental shelf.

References

Further references
 Biolib

Nototheniidae
Perciformes genera
Fish of the Southern Ocean
Fish of Antarctica
Taxa named by George Albert Boulenger